Pseudogobiopsis festivus is a species of goby endemic to Malaysia where it is only known from the rainforest freshwater streams of Sarawak.

References

Pseudogobiopsis
Fish described in 2009